Tresco is a locality in Victoria, Australia, located approximately 23 km from Swan Hill. It was named after Tresco, Isles of Scilly, England.

Tresco Post Office opened on 14 September 1914 at the railway station and closed in 1993. A Tresco West Post Office was open between 1923 and 1925.

References

Towns in Victoria (Australia)
Rural City of Swan Hill